Bote Mountain is a mountain in Great Smoky Mountains National Park of Tennessee, in the United States.

Those rocks are sedimentary rocks, and were deposited on an ancient ocean floor on the edge of a supercontinent.

Bote Mountain was named because of a misunderstanding when, in the 1830s, Cherokee workers were asked which route a new road would follow. They pointed towards Bote Mountain and said "vote", which was interpreted by the white workers, who thought they were naming the mountain, as "bote". Hence, the mountain was named "Bote Mountain".

The Bote Mountain Trail follows the crest of the mountain, and intersects the Appalachian Trail at Spence Field.

References

Mountains of Blount County, Tennessee
Mountains of Tennessee
Mountains of Great Smoky Mountains National Park